Domantas is a Lithuanian masculine given name. It may refer to:
 Domantas Antanavičius (born 1998), is a Lithuanian footballer
 Donatas Motiejūnas, Lithuanian American basketball player
  (born 1983), Lithuanian singer-songwriter and poet
 Domantas Sabonis (born 1996), Lithuanian basketball player
 Domantas Šeškus (born 1991), Lithuanian basketball player
 Domantas Šimkus (born 1996), Lithuanian football

See also
 Daumantas (disambiguation)

Lithuanian masculine given names